Jinpachi (written: 甚八) is a masculine Japanese given name. Notable people with the name include:

, Japanese actor

Fictional characters

, in Nanaka 6/17
, in Young Gun Carnaval
, in Tekken
, in Please Save My Earth

Japanese masculine given names